The Southern Ontario Junior Hockey League (SOJHL) is a former Canadian Junior ice hockey league sanctioned by the Ontario Hockey Association based out of Southwestern Ontario.  Prior to the 2012-13 season, the SOJHL was promoted to the Junior C level.

In the summer of 2016, the SOJHL was merged into the Provincial Junior Hockey League.

History

Founded in the 1960s as the Shamrock Junior D Hockey League.  In 1969, the League would change its name to the Western Junior D Hockey League and its champion would go on to win eleven of the next nineteen provincial championships.  In the Summer of 1985, the North Junior D Hockey League would fold, leaving the Western League and the Southern Counties Junior D Hockey League.  In 1988, the SCJDHL would fold and its remaining teams joined the Western League.  Bloated to nineteen teams, the league would continue on as the only Junior D league in Ontario.  In 1991, the league became the OHA Junior Development League.  In 2006, in an attempt to gain promotion to Junior C, the league dropped any reference of Junior D or Development and renamed itself the Southern Ontario Junior Hockey League. 

During the summer of 2006, the Yeck Conference applied to break off from the league and start their own Junior C league, but were turned down by the OHA.  A talented and entertaining league, the SOJHL has a long-standing tradition of the OHA in the Southwestern Ontario region.

The SOJHL downsized extensively for the 2008-09 season, losing Mitchell, West Lorne, and Central Elgin.  The league also reformatted into three divisions.

The SOJHL saw the Central Elgin franchise return, this time as the Port Stanley Sailors, for the 2009-2010 season.

As of 2012, the SOJHL is in talks with the OHA as to the future of the league.  The 2012-13 season will be played at the Junior C level and the league will be folded and divided up into other leagues in the summer of 2013.

In the Spring of 2013, Junior C hockey in Ontario had its first major realignment since the creation of the Georgian Mid-Ontario Junior C Hockey League in 1994.  The 27 teams between the Niagara & District Junior C Hockey League and the Southern Ontario Junior Hockey League were reshuffled.  The SOJHL went from 15 to 9 teams, gaining the Aylmer Spitfires, but losing their reigning champion Ayr Centennials, the Burford Bulldogs, Delhi Travellers, Hagersville Hawks, Norfolk Rebels, Tavistock Braves, and Wellesley Applejacks.  That summer the Niagara League would divide in half, forming the Midwestern Junior C Hockey League with its former Western Division.

The Teams

2015-16 Playoffs
Winner moves on to the Clarence Schmalz Cup.

Champions

League Title 
From 1989 on, the winner of the league was also provincial champions and was awarded the OHA Cup.  Bolded are league champions, italicized are runners-up in years with three divisions.

Regular Season Champions
This chart starts at the unification of the Junior D leagues, through the SOJHL's ascension to Junior C, until its merger into the Provincial Junior Hockey League in 2016.

Former Member Teams 
Alvinston Flyers
Ayr Centennials
Bothwell Barons
Burford Bulldogs
Delhi Travellers
Hagersville Hawks
Hanover Hurricanes
Hensall-Zurich Combines
Lambeth Flyers
Langton Thunderbirds
Mitchell Hawks
Ohsweken Golden Eagles
Paris Mounties
Port Dover Sailors
St. George Dukes
Seaforth Centenaires
Strathroy Falcons
Tavistock Braves
Thedford Browns
Wellesley Applejacks
West Lorne Lakers
Zurich Dominions

References

External links 
OHA Webpage

C
C